The Calore Lucano (or Calore Salernitano) is a river in Campania, 
It is an important left tributary of the Sele. In ancient times it was known as Calor.

Overview
It rises in the northern slopes of Monte Cervati, in the Apennine Mountains and flows through the Parco nazionale del Cilento e Vallo di Diano. For long reaches it flows between high rocky walls, as near Laurino or in the gorge of Monte Pescorubino, between the localities of Magliano Vetere and Felitto.

It empties into the Sele not far from the ancient city of Paestum.

The Calore is one of the few rivers in Europe in which the European otter still lives.

References

External links

Drainage basins of the Tyrrhenian Sea
Cilento
Rivers of the Province of Salerno
Rivers of Italy